Liquid Force is a manufacturer of wakeboard and kiteboarding related products, gear, and clothing, based in the United States. The company also has a wakeskating and wakesurfing division besides the wakeboarding and kiteboarding focus.
Liquid Force now counts as one of the leading manufacturers in the wakeboard related products and clothing market.
Besides manufacturing wakeboard related products and clothing, the company sponsors numerous events and athletes to promote the sport.
Liquid Force was founded in 1995 by Tony Finn and Jimmy Redmon, both pioneers in the sport of wakeboarding. Its headquarters are located in Encinitas, California.

History

1985–1994
In 1985 the future founders of Liquid Force Tony Finn and Jimmy Redmon separately looked for alternatives to waterskiing and surfing.
Tony Finn created the so-called "skurfer" which had a similar shape to a surfboard but was much shorter.
At the same time Jimmy Redmon came up with a water ski board which was produced by his own company Redline Designs. On contrary to the "skurfer" the water ski board was a bit lighter and the first to have foot straps.
Founding the World Wakeboard Association (WWA), a governing body for the sport, Redmon created several contests, where  Finn worked as an announcer resulting in the two crossing paths several times.

1991 Waketech
Being rivals at first they soon became aware of each other's strengths which led to the establishment of their own firm, Waketech, with the help of an investor.
In 1993 Waketech produced the Flight 69, the first twin-tip board with a symmetrical design, an innovation on the wakeboard market allowing riders to ride with either their left or right foot forward. Hence the new design was superior to the one pointed tip boards resulting in their team riders claiming titles at a wakeboard contest.
In spite of their influence changing the sport of wakeboarding, Tony Finn and Jimmy Redmon had to deal with a setback.  They had trouble with their investor and the two faced the end of Waketech.

1995 - present Liquid Force
In 1995 three weeks before the World Championships Finn and Redmon founded a new firm called Liquid Force. Just in time for the Championships the two were able to present their new brand for the first time to the public by providing their team riders with Liquid Force Wakeboards and outfits . The company has won the WSIA Manufacturer of the Year award in 2005 and 2008. In 2008 Liquid Force bought  Straight Line manufacturer of wakeboard and water ski ropes from the Yoshida Group.

Sponsorship
Liquid Force is an active international sports and events sponsor. In order to promote the sport Liquid Force sponsors a variety of initiatives throughout the year for example The Monster Energy Triple Crown and others. Furthermore the company is constantly increasing its team of riders from countries all over the world such as USA, Germany, Argentina and Thailand.

Wakeboarding team
Shane Bonifay
Harley Clifford
Raphael Derome
Meagan Ethell
Daniel Fetz
Adam Fields
Tom Fooshee
Daniel Grant
Nico von Lerchenfeld
Melissa Marquardt
Nikita Martyanov
Frederic von Osten
Robbie Rendo
Bob Soven
Shawn Watson
Robbie Brown

Obscura (Wakeskating) team

James Balzer
Travis Doran
Danny Hampson
Daniel Grant
Aaron Reed
Grant Roberts
Kyle Hyams
Stefan Schriewer

Kiteboarding team
 Jason Slezak
 Brandon Scheid
 Julien Fillon
 Claire Lutz
 James Boulding
 Dave Shah
 Manuela Jungo
 Christophe Tack
 Sensi Graves
 Oliver Umpierre

Wakesurfing team
 Andrew Davidson
 Andre Broussard
 Brooks Wilson
 Travis Robinson

Events
Besides sponsoring numerous initiatives, Liquid Force has been starting to launch its own events. Its main events are BROstock, BBQ BROdown and the Free For All Cable Tour, which is taking place in several cable park locations in the nation where people can learn to wakeboard for free.

References

External links 
 Official Website

Wakeboarding